Mongeperipatus kekoldi is a species of velvet worm in the Peripatidae family. Males of this species have 32 or 33 pairs of legs; females have 37 to 39. The largest females can reach 18 cm in length. This species was discovered in Costa Rica.

References

Onychophorans of tropical America
Onychophoran species
Animals described in 2020